This is a list of notable Christian music record labels.  Also see :Category:Christian record labels

List

0-9
 5 Minute Walk
 7Spin Music

A
 Alarma Records
 Alternative Records
 Angelophone Records
 Ardent Records

B
 BEC Recordings
 Bethel Music
 Bibletone Records
 Broken Records
 Beach Street Records
 Blood and Ink Records

C
 Capitol Christian Music Group (formerly EMI CMG)
 Centricity Music
 Chapel Records
 Christian Faith Recordings
 Credential Recordings
 Cross Movement Records
 Curb Records

E
 Essential Records

F
 Facedown Records
 Fair Trade Services (formerly INO Records)
 Fervent Records
 Flicker Records
 Floodgate Records
 ForeFront Records
 Frontline Records

G
 Galaxy21 Music
 Gotee Records

H
 Hillsong Music

I
 Inpop Records
 Integrity Music

L
 Lamon Records
 Loveworld Records

M
 Maranatha! Music
 Mono vs Stereo
 Myrrh Records

N
 Northern Records

P
 Pamplin Music 
 Provident Label Group

R
 Reach Records
 Red Hammer Records
 Refuge Records
 Reunion Records
 Rocketown Records

S
 Sixstepsrecords
 Slanted Records
 Solid State Records
 Sonorous Entertainment
 Sparrow Records
 Spring Hill Music Group (formerly Chapel Hill Music Group)
 Star Song Communications

T
 Tate Music Group
 Tooth & Nail Records
 Tyscot Records

W
 Word Records

See also
 List of record labels
 
 

+Record Labels
Christian